Narcetes wonderi is a species of fish in the family Alepocephalidae (slickheads). It is found in the waters of Japan.

Etymology
The fish is named in honor of taxidermist Frank C. Wonder (1904-1963) of the Field Museum of Natural History in Chicago.

References

Nakabo, T., 2002. Fishes of Japan with pictorial keys to the species, English edition I. Tokai University Press, Japan, pp v-866.

Alepocephalidae
Fish of Japan
Taxa named by Albert William Herre
Fish described in 1935